Oleksandrivka is a village (selo) in Kherson Raion, Kherson Oblast, southern Ukraine. It has formerly been called Bublykov, Nyzhni Solonets, Kashov, Shtykhov, and Miloradovich. The population was approximately 2,596 people.

Administrative status 
Until 18 July 2020, Oleksandrivka was located in the Bilozerka Raion. The raion was abolished in July 2020 as part of the administrative reform of Ukraine, which reduced the number of raions of Kherson Oblast to five. The area of Bilozerka Raion was merged into Kherson Raion.

Geography

The village is on the shore of the Dnieper–Bug estuary, an inlet of the Black Sea. A lake at the western end of the village is separated from the estuary by a narrow strip of land with a road running along it. Beyond the lake, the coastal strip is part of the 996-hectare Oleksandrivka protected landscape area of ​​national importance, which was created in 2002.

History 
Oleksandrivka is located near the suburbs of Olbia Pontica, an ancient Greek colony on the mouth of the river Borysthenes.

In 1754, the village of Oleksandrivka was founded by the Cossacks. There were winter quarters and fish factories (called Sapetnya), where the Cossacks were engaged in fishing and extracting salt from the Dnieper–Bug liman (estuary).

In 1781, the estate of Russian general Pyotr Rumyantsev had surrounded the earlier Cossack settlement, and a formal village was proclaimed.

Several important battles of the Russo-Turkish War of 1787–1792 took place in the liman next to Oleksandrivka. These battles included the Dnieper Flotilla, John Paul Jones's deep-water fleet, and the Ottoman Navy, which fought in the First Battle of the Liman on June 7, 1788, and the Second Battle of the Liman on June 16–17.

In 1918, the village became part of Ukrainian People's Republic. With the failure of the Ukrainian War of Independence, the village became part of the Soviet Union. In 2015, during nationwide decommunization, a statue of Vladimir Lenin was torn down by an unknown person.

2022 Russian invasion of Ukraine 

During the 2022 Russian invasion of Ukraine, Oleksandrivka changed hands multiple times due to its location between the cities of Mykolaiv and Kherson.

Demographics
The native languages as of the Ukrainian Census of 2001 were:
 Ukrainian 90.68%
 Russian 8.59%
 Moldovan 0.23%
 Belarusian 0.19%
 Others 0.39%

References

Commons category link is on Wikidata
Populated places established in 1754
Populated places established in the Russian Empire
Villages in Kherson Raion
Khersonsky Uyezd